Dale Leroy Locker (November 2, 1929 – August 14, 2011) was a former Democratic member of the Ohio House of Representatives, representing the 80th District from 1973 to 1984. He also ran for a seat in the United States House of Representatives in a 1981 special election, but lost to Michael Oxley by less than 500 votes.

He died at his home in 2011.

References

Republican Party members of the Ohio House of Representatives
2011 deaths
1929 births
People from Sidney, Ohio